Hin Keng (Literal Meaning: "Show Path") is a station on the , part of the MTR rapid transit network in Hong Kong. It opened on 14 February 2020 as part of the Tuen Ma line's first phase. It was built as part of the Sha Tin to Central Link project. The station is located near Hin Keng Estate in Tai Wai, Sha Tin, New Territories. It is an elevated station with one entrance facing Che Kung Miu Road.

History

The station was built on the site of the New Territories South Animal Management Centre and Shatin Plant Quarantine Station, facilities of the Agriculture, Fisheries and Conservation Department, which were relocated to a new facility on To Shek Street (多石街) in November 2013.

The station and approach structures were built under MTR contract number 1102. Worth HK$1.039 billion, the contract was awarded to Japanese construction firm Penta-Ocean on 5 July 2013. Major sub-contractors employed on the project include Hong Kong company Ngai Shun Construction & Drilling Company as well as the Chinese state-owned China Geo-Engineering Corporation. The architect was Hong Kong-based Leigh and Orange. Construction of Hin Keng station began with a ceremony on 13 November that year.

A topping-out ceremony for the station was held on 30 April 2015, making Hin Keng the first station on the Sha Tin to Central Link to be topped out.

Design
Hin Keng station is an elevated station with an open design that allows for natural lighting and ventilation, reducing energy consumption. Both the concourse and platform levels are designed to promote cross ventilation, intended to achieve comfortable thermal conditions without the use of air conditioning. Computerised fluid dynamics analyses were carried out to inform this design. In addition, architectural fins on the station's exterior are provided to reduce solar thermal gain.

The green roof, as well as the use of wood and other brown-coloured materials in the station design, was intended to visually blend the station into the surrounding environment (it is adjacent to a wooded hillside).

The glass canopies on the station exterior, which provide protection from the elements, double as artworks. They incorporate a colourful design resembling a patchwork quilt, which was designed by Hong Kong artist Ng Ka-chun and Hin Keng Estate residents.

Station layout

Entrances/exits

A: Hin Keng Estate

Gallery

References

External links

 Shatin to Central Link - Shatin Section Newsletter, December 2010, p. 2
 Environmental Impact Assessment: Tai Wai to Hung Hom

MTR stations in the New Territories
Sha Tin to Central Link
Tuen Ma line
Tai Wai
Railway stations in Hong Kong opened in 2020